The Hamburg Sea Devils were an American football team that played in NFL Europe from 2005 to 2007. They played their home games at Hamburg's Volksparkstadion (also home to the German association football team Hamburger SV).  They played their first game on 2 April 2005 losing 24–23 to the Cologne Centurions (who were the newest NFL Europe franchise before the Sea Devils).  The Sea Devils' first win came in Week 3 of the 2005 season, with a 31–24 home victory over the then-struggling Rhein Fire.

Their first head coach was Jack Bicknell, previously head coach of the defunct Barcelona Dragons and Scottish Claymores. The Sea Devils had directly replaced the Claymores after the 2004 season.

On 1 April 2006, the Sea Devils recorded their first tie in franchise history.  At home, they scored 17 points in the second quarter, against the Berlin Thunder.  They had blown their 17-point lead before regulation ended.  When no one scored in overtime, the game ended in a draw.  This was only the second tie in the NFL Europa history. The previous tie came in the 1992 season between the Rhein Fire and the London Monarchs. The final score for that game was also 17–17.

On 29 March 2007, Bicknell resigned, citing health issues as the reason. He was replaced by offensive coordinator Vince Martino.

On 23 June 2007, the Sea Devils won their first World Bowl championship with a 37–28 victory over the defending champion Frankfurt Galaxy. It was also their last, as NFL Europa disbanded almost immediately following the game. As a result, the Sea Devils are the last team to win a WLAF/NFL Europe/NFL Europa game ever.

The Sea Devils were brought to American media attention again on 14 July 2007, when 2006 team member Mike Jemison was arrested in Pennsylvania for robbery.  Previously, Thomas Herrion, an offensive tackle allocated to the team by the San Francisco 49ers, died after a preseason game against the Denver Broncos in August 2005. Former Tampa Bay Buccaneers cornerback Brent Grimes also played for the Sea Devils. Coach and former cornerback Nate Jacks from Atlanta, Georgia also played for the Sea Devils.

An unrelated team of the same name is to play in the inaugural 2021 season of the new European League of Football.

Season-by-season

NFL Europe

Head coaches

Gallery

 
NFL Europe (WLAF) teams
Defunct American football teams in Germany
Sport in Hamburg
American football teams established in 2005
American football teams disestablished in 2007
2005 establishments in Germany
2007 disestablishments in Germany